Mari Osmundsen is the literary pseudonym of Anne Kristine Halling (born 20 June 1951), a Norwegian novelist and children's writer. She made her literary debut in 1978 with the novel Vi klarer det!. Osmundsen was awarded the Gyldendal's Endowment in 1984 (shared with Simen Skjønsberg).

References

1951 births
Living people
People from Molde
20th-century Norwegian novelists
Norwegian children's writers
Norwegian women novelists
Norwegian women children's writers
20th-century Norwegian women writers